Anomiidae is a family of saltwater clams, marine bivalve molluscs related to scallops and oysters, and known as anomiids. It contains seven genera.

The family is known by several common names, including jingle shells, mermaid's toenails, and saddle oysters.

Description
Anomiids have extremely thin, translucent, paper-like shells. There is often a hole in the lower shell, caused by growth of the shell around the byssus. The shell follows the shape of the object it lies on - usually a rock or a large shell of another creature.

Uses
The flesh of members of this family is unpleasantly bitter and is not eaten. However, industrial uses of the shell include manufacture into, or as part of, glue, chalk, paint, shellac and solder. Capiz shells, the shells of Placuna placenta, the windowpane oyster, are made into decorative objects such as lampshades, in Asia.

Genera and species
The following genera and species are recognised by the World Register of Marine Species:

 Anomia
 Anomia achaeus  Gray, 1850
 Anomia chinensis Philippi, 1849 - Chinese jingle shell 
 Anomia cytaeum  Gray, 1850
 Anomia ephippium Linnaeus, 1758 - European jingle shell 
 Anomia macostata  Huber, 2010
 Anomia peruviana d'Orbigny, 1846 - Peruvian jingle shell 
 Anomia simplex d'Orbigny, 1842 - Common jingle shell  
 Anomia trigonopsis Hutton, 1877 - New Zealand jingle shell
 Enigmonia
Enigmonia aenigmatica (Holten, 1803) - Mangrove jingle shell
 Heteranomia
 Heteranomia squamula (Linnaeus, 1758) - Prickly jingle 
 Isomonia
 Isomonia alberti  (Dautzenberg & H. Fischer, 1897)
 Isomonia umbonata  (Gould, 1861)
 Monia
 Monia colon  (Gray, 1850)
 Monia deliciosa  Iredale, 1936
 Monia macroschisma (Deshayes, 1839)
 Monia nobilis  (Reeve, 1859)
 Monia patelliformis  (Linnaeus, 1767)
 Monia squama  (Gmelin, 1791)
 Monia timida  Iredale, 1939
 Monia zelandica (Gray, 1843)
 Patro 
 Patro australis (Gray in Jukes, 1847)
 Patro undatus
 Pododesmus
Pododesmus foliatus (Broderip, 1834)
Pododesmus macrochisma (Deshayes, 1839)
Pododesmus patelliformis (Linnaeus, 1761) - Ribbed saddle-oyster
Pododesmus rudis (Broderip, 1834) - False Atlantic jingle shell

References

 
Bivalve families
Taxa named by Constantine Samuel Rafinesque